Karl Heinrich Kaufhold (29 August 1932 – 16 July 2020) was a German economic historian. He worked for the University of Göttingen.

Works
Das Handwerk der Stadt Hildesheim im 18. Jahrhundert. Eine wirtschaftsgeschichtliche Studie (1968)
Das Metallgewerbe der Grafschaft Mark im 18. und frühen 19. Jahrhundert (1976)
Das Gewerbe in Preußen um 1800 (1978)
Bergbau und Hüttenwesen in und am Harz (1991)
Mittelalter und frühe Neuzeit (1997)
Historische Statistik der preußischen Provinz Ostfriesland (1998)
Europäische Montanregion Harz (2001)
Preise im vor- und frühindustriellen Deutschland. Nahrungsmittel – Getränke – Gewürze – Rohstoffe und Gewerbeprodukte (2001)
Die Wirtschafts- und Sozialgeschichte des Braunschweigischen Landes vom Mittelalter bis zur Gegenwart (2008)

References

1932 births
2020 deaths
20th-century German historians
People from Hildesheim
21st-century German historians